James Edwin Robertson (October 8, 1840 – October 30, 1915) was a Canadian physician and politician.

Born in New Perth, Prince Edward Island, the son of Peter Robertson and Annie McFarlane, Robertson was educated at McGill University where he graduated with honours in 1865, after which he located in Montague, Prince Edward Island where he has worked up a large practice.

In 1870, he was acclaimed to the Legislative Assembly of Prince Edward Island for 4th Kings. He was re-elected in 1876 but was defeated in 1879. He was re-elected in 1882. He was a Minister Without Portfolio in the cabinet of Robert Poore Haythorne and Louis Henry Davies.

He was elected to the House of Commons of Canada for King's County in the 1882 election.

Unseating
In 1883, he was declared not duly elected on the grounds that he was a member of the Prince Edward Island Legislative Assembly at the time of the election, in defiance of the law banning dual mandates. Shortly after winning his federal seat, he had submitted his resignation notice from the provincial legislature to two fellow MLAs, Malcolm McFadyen and Peter McLaren, in accordance with the process for resigning from the legislature, and the legislature had already held a by-election to replace him. However, a procedural error by McFadyen and McLaren had left the resignation not properly registered, thus leaving his provincial office technically double-seated and his eligibility for federal office in doubt. While several Canadian provinces did at the time allow people to simultaneously hold seats in both the provincial and federal legislatures, Prince Edward Island had enacted a law explicitly disallowing this.

The federal committee adjudicating the matter was dominated by the governing Conservative Party, whereas Robertson was a Liberal. The committee ruled that his resignation from the provincial legislature was not valid, and voted to unseat Robertson; rather than holding a by-election, the committee directly awarded the seat to Augustine Macdonald, the Conservative candidate whom Robertson had defeated in the federal election.

He was re-elected in 1887, but was defeated in 1891.

Senate appointment
In 1902, he was appointed to the Senate of Canada on the advice of Wilfrid Laurier, representing the senatorial division of Prince Edward Island. He served until April 1915.

References

External links
 

This article incorporates text from The Canadian album: men of Canada, Vol. 3, a publication now in the public domain.

1840 births
1915 deaths
People from Kings County, Prince Edward Island
Canadian senators from Prince Edward Island
Liberal Party of Canada MPs
Liberal Party of Canada senators
McGill University alumni
Members of the House of Commons of Canada from Prince Edward Island
Prince Edward Island Liberal Party MLAs